The Just Push Play Tour was a concert tour by Aerosmith that took the band across North America and Japan. Supporting their 2001 album Just Push Play, it ran from June 2001 to February 2002.

The tour was successful, despite several cancellations due in part to the September 11 terrorist attacks. The tour earned $46.5 million from 56 shows in North America.

Background
The tour came on the heels of the band's platinum album Just Push Play. Aerosmith was riding a wave of popularity, having played the Super Bowl XXXV Halftime Show, been inducted into the Rock and Roll Hall of Fame, and scored a Top 10 hit, all within the first half of the year.

Just prior to the start of the tour, the band performed a brief promo tour in Germany. They also performed at many radio festivals in the United States, including: "River Rave", "Zootopia" and the "Kiss Concert".

Tyler sang the National Anthem at the Indianapolis 500, and the team sponsored a car in the race.

As a result, many shows sold out and the band added arena dates through the fall and winter, even after a successful summer amphitheater tour. "If we couldn't get an audience[...]having made a record we truly believe in, then I guess we probably would turn around and say, 'It's been fun, but see ya.' But I tell you this: we wouldn't go without a big fucking fight."

United We Stand
The band played the United We Stand: What More Can I Give benefit concert at RFK Stadium in Washington, D.C. on October 21, 2001, alongside Michael Jackson, Mariah Carey, and other pop stars. The band had been uncertain whether to play the show due to scheduling conflicts and made the decision almost at the last minute. They took the stage in the afternoon, played four songs, then flew to Indianapolis for a concert that same night.

Cancellations
In the wake of the September 11 terrorist attacks, the band canceled the three shows after that (Virginia Beach, Camden, New Jersey, and Columbia, Maryland); all on the Eastern Seaboard, where the attacks had occurred. These shows were rescheduled. The band canceled a second show at Irvine, California earlier in the tour, due to a scheduling conflict with the filming of the video for "Sunshine."

Stage setup
The stage for the tour had a modern look, reflecting the aesthetic of Just Push Play and its cover. Most striking were the silver and white colors, as well as two curving staircases that met at a platform at the top. There, some of the most exciting moments took place, including the entrance of Steven Tyler and Joe Perry at the beginning of the show, as well as Tyler singing the eerie lyrics that open "Seasons of Wither"

The band set up a second smaller stage in the rear of outdoor pavilions to play for those in the lawn section. During the middle of the show, the band members would walk under heavy security to this stage to do a three-song set.

Tyler jokingly referred to this tour as the "Back on the Grass Tour": a reference to this auxiliary stage and a jab at those who claimed Aerosmith was using drugs again. Tyler especially targeted former manager Tim Collins, who had accused Aerosmith of relapsing before the band fired him in 1996. However, "Back On The Grass" was not an official name for the tour – just a joke Tyler repeated in interviews.

Song selection
The setlist featured as many as 25 songs. It varied show to show, as most Aerosmith setlists do, but usually included about half a dozen songs from Just Push Play as well a fair balance between their 70s classics and 80s and 90s hits.

Broadcasts and recordings

In January 2002, the band played The Joint, a 2,000 seat venue within the Hard Rock Hotel and Casino. This show was recorded and parts of it were released as the band's fifth live album, a Dual Disc CD/DVD entitled Rockin' the Joint, released in 2005.

Opening acts
Fuel 
The Cult

Setlist
The following setlist was obtained from the concert held on June 26, 2001, at the Tweeter Center for the Performing Arts in Mansfield, Massachusetts. It does not represent all concerts for the duration of the tour. 
"Beyond Beautiful"
"Love in an Elevator"
"Jaded"
"Just Push Play"
"Big Ten Inch Record"
"Fly Away from Here"
"Pink"
"Mama Kin"
"Same Old Song and Dance"
"Dream On"
"Toys in the Attic"
"Angel's Eye"
"Draw the Line"
"Under My Skin"
"Seasons of Wither"
"Cryin'"
"I Don't Want to Miss a Thing"
"Walk This Way"
"Sweet Emotion"
Encore
"Livin' on the Edge"
"What It Takes"
"Train Kept A-Rollin'"

Tour dates

Festivals and other miscellaneous performances
This concert was a part of "Wango Tango"

Cancellations and rescheduled shows

Box office score data

References

External links
Aerosmith official website
JUST PUSH PLAY TOUR - AeroForceOne

Aerosmith concert tours
2001 concert tours
2002 concert tours